Hanumantia is an island in Madhya Pradesh. It is developed and managed by Madhya Pradesh (MP) Tourism Development Corporation. The island was named after its name in a local village which is located in the Khandwa district. Hanumantia also hosts large water carnivals for adventure seekers.

Transport

The nearest airport is Devi Ahilya Bai Holkar Airport and located in the Indore district. It is 150 km from the island. The nearest railway station is located in the  Khandwa district and 50 km from the island. The road can be reached by way of Khandwa or Indore.

Weather

Three major weather conditions can be experienced on the island. In the month of November, the cold begins, which remains till March. During the winter, the average temperature in the morning is 5 °C and the mean temperature in the afternoon is 15 °C. The summer starts in April and lasts until June. At this time the average temperature is around 45 °C (during the day) and 24 °C after sunset. The island's monsoon season starts in July ending in October.

Water festival

The water festival was organized for the first time from 12 to 21 February 2016. During the festival, many activities were organized by the tourism department, such as kite flying, volleyball, campfire, star gazing, cycling, paratroaring, parasailing, hot air balloon and bird watching.

References
 
 https://web.archive.org/web/20161216021426/http://www.madhya-pradesh-tourism.com/leisure/dams/hanumantiya-island.html
 https://web.archive.org/web/20161120135615/http://www.jalmahotsav.com/
 https://web.archive.org/web/20170507235919/http://jalmahotsav.hanumantiyatapu.com/
 

Geography of Madhya Pradesh